Akif Javed (born 10 October 2000) is a Pakistani cricketer. In September 2019, he was named in Balochistan's squad for the 2019–20 Quaid-e-Azam Trophy tournament. He made his Twenty20 debut on 13 October 2019, for Balochistan in the 2019–20 National T20 Cup. He made his first-class debut for Balochistan in the 2019–20 Quaid-e-Azam Trophy on 28 October 2019.

In November 2019, he was named in Pakistan's squad for the 2019 ACC Emerging Teams Asia Cup in Bangladesh. He made his List A debut for Pakistan, against Afghanistan, in the Emerging Teams Cup on 14 November 2019. In October 2021, he was named in the Pakistan Shaheens squad for their tour of Sri Lanka.

References

External links
 

2000 births
Living people
Pashtun people
People from Karak District
Pakistani cricketers
Baluchistan cricketers
Islamabad United cricketers